Quantian OS was a remastering of Knoppix/Debian for computational sciences. The environment was self-configuring and directly bootable CD/DVD that turns any PC or laptop (provided it can boot from cdrom/DVD) into a Linux workstation. Quantian also incorporated clusterKnoppix and added support for openMosix, including remote booting of light clients in an openMosix terminal server context permitting rapid setup of a SMP cluster computer.

Applications

Numerous software packages for usual or scientific aims come with Quantian. After the installation, total package volume is about 2.7 GB (For the detailed package list see: List of all the available packages).

The packages for "home users" include:
KDE, the default desktop environment and their components
XMMS, Kaffeine, xine media players
Internet access software, including the KPPP dialer, ISDN utilities and WLAN
The Mozilla, Mozilla Firefox and Konqueror web browsers
K3b, for CD (and DVD) management
The GIMP, an image-manipulation program
Tools for data rescue and system repair
Network analysis and administration tools
OpenOffice.org
Kile, Lyx

Additionally, some of the scientific applications/programs in Quantian are such like:

R, statistical computing software
Octave, a Matlab clone
Scilab, another Matlab clone
GSL, GNU Scientific Library
Maxima computer algebra system
Python programming language with Scipy
Fityk curve fitter
 Ghemical for computational chemistry
Texmacs for wysiwyg scientific editing 
Grass geographic information system
OpenDX and MayaVi data visualisation systems
Gnuplot, a command-line driven interactive data and function plotting utility
LabPlot, an application for plotting of data sets and functions

References
 Quantian Home Page
 While discontinued, available without support on this archiveOS page

Knoppix
Linux distributions
Science software
Discontinued Linux distributions